"He Didn't Have to Be" is a song co-written and recorded by American country music artist Brad Paisley. It was released in August 1999 as the second single from his debut album, Who Needs Pictures. In December 1999, it became his first number one single, holding the top spot for one week.

Background
The song was based on Paisley's frequent co-writer and best friend, Kelley Lovelace's stepson McCain Merren, who attended the 2000 ACM Awards as Paisley's guest. According to Lovelace, Paisley said to him, "Let's make a song about you two that will make your wife cry."

Content
This song is written from the perspective of a son of a single mother. The single mother begins dating a new man who almost immediately includes the child in things like going to the movies. In the final verse, the son now is about ready to become a father himself, standing in the hospital next to his stepfather and hoping that he can be "at least half the dad" that his stepfather "didn't have to be." This song is set in the key of A major in common time, and has a vocal range from A3 to D5.

Music video
The music video was directed by Deaton Flanigen and premiered on August 17, 1999 on CMT.

Chart performance
"He Didn't Have to Be" debuted at number 72 on the U.S. Billboard Hot Country Songs for the week of September 4, 1999. "He Didn't Have to Be" spent 30 weeks on the Billboard Hot Country Songs, peaking at number one in December 1999 and holding that position for one week.

Year-end charts

References

1999 singles
Country ballads
1990s ballads
Brad Paisley songs
Songs written by Brad Paisley
Songs written by Kelley Lovelace
Music videos directed by Deaton-Flanigen Productions
Song recordings produced by Frank Rogers (record producer)
Arista Nashville singles
1999 songs
Songs about fathers